Tromba, Italian for trumpet, may refer to:
 Tromba (film), a 1949 Italian-West German thriller film directed by Helmut Weiss
 Tromba (skipper), a genus of skippers

See also
 
 Trombas, a town and municipality in north Goiás state, Brazil